Helen Cooper may refer to:

Helen Cooper (literary scholar), professor of Medieval and Renaissance English 
Helen Cooper (illustrator) (born 1963), illustrator and author of children's books
Helen Cooper (politician) (born 1946), former mayor of Kingston, Ontario
Helen J. Cooper, British chemist